St. Mark's Church is on Nottingham Road, Mansfield, Nottinghamshire, England.  It is an active Church of England parish church in the deanery of Mansfield, the archdeaconry of Newark, and the Southwell and Nottingham diocese. The church is recorded in the National Heritage List for England as a designated Grade II* listed building.

Behind the church, the church hall is a Grade II listed building.

History
St. Mark's church was built by the architect Temple Lushington Moore and opened in 1897.

Stained glass
There are two stained glass windows by Charles Eamer Kempe at the west end.

Organ
The organ dates from 1900 by the builders Brindley & Foster of Sheffield. It was renovated by Henry Willis and Sons in 1955, Midland Organ Builders in 1974 and more recently by Anthony Herrod. A complete re-build was finished in 2014 by Henry Groves.

External features

In the churchyard, the war memorial and railings 1 metre south of St. Mark's Church is Grade II listed.

Gallery

See also

List of new churches by Temple Moore

References

Sources
The Buildings of England, Nottinghamshire. Nikolaus Pevsner

Mansfield
Mansfield
Churches completed in 1897
19th-century Church of England church buildings
Temple Moore buildings
Buildings and structures in Mansfield